The Naga National Democratic Party is a regional political party in Nagaland, India, founded in 1964. The party was formed from a merger of the United Democratic Front and the Naga National Party. John Bosco Jasokie is the party leader.

Electoral history

References

Political parties in Nagaland
1964 establishments in Nagaland
Political parties established in 1964